Khoonkhwuttunne (also, Qo-on-qwut-tunne) is a former Tolowa settlement in Del Norte County, California, located at the mouth of the Smith River. It lay at an elevation of 33 feet (10 m).

References

External links

Former settlements in Del Norte County, California
Former Native American populated places in California
Tolowa villages